Bagas Umar Pamungkas (born 3 February 2001) is an Indonesian professional footballer who plays as a forward for Liga 2 club Putra Delta Sidoarjo.

Club career

PSS Sleman
Umar signed with Madura United to play in the Indonesian Liga 1 for the 2020 season. This season was suspended on 27 March 2020 due to the COVID-19 pandemic. The season was abandoned and was declared void on 20 January 2021. He made his professional league debut on 6 February 2022 in a match against Barito Putera at the Kompyang Sujana Stadium, Denpasar.

Career statistics

Club

Notes

References

External links
 Bagas Umar at Soccerway
 Bagas Umar at Liga Indonesia

2001 births
Living people
Indonesian footballers
PSS Sleman players
Association football forwards
People from Sleman Regency